Krzynowłoga may refer to:

Krzynowłoga Mała - Village in Masovian Voivodeship, in Gmina Krzynowłoga Mała, Poland
Krzynowłoga Wielka - Village in Masovian Voivodeship, in Gmina Chorzele, Poland